Ricardo Abel Barbosa Ferreira (born 3 December 1989), known simply as Ricardo, is a Portuguese professional footballer who plays for Slovak club FC DAC 1904 Dunajská Streda as a goalkeeper.

Club career
Ricardo was born in Braga. A product of hometown S.C. Braga's youth system, he was promoted to the first team for the 2007–08 season as fourth goalkeeper.

In the following two years, Ricardo played for S.C. Olhanense in Algarve, the first on loan, appearing in only two matches. In the 2009–10 campaign, with the club in the Primeira Liga for the first time in 34 years, he started in the last matchday as the side were already safe from relegation, featuring in the 2–2 away draw against F.C. Paços de Ferreira.

Ricardo signed with C.S. Marítimo in the summer of 2010, being mainly associated with the reserves during his spell in Madeira. Four years later, after a season-long loan at the club, he joined Portimonense S.C. from the Segunda Liga on a three-year contract. He contributed 40 games in 2016–17, helping to a top-division return after six years, and was rewarded with a three-year extension.

From 2020, Ricardo lost his starting place to first Shūichi Gonda and later Samuel Portugal. The 32-year-old moved abroad for the first time in his career in February 2022, joining FC DAC 1904 Dunajská Streda of the Slovak Super Liga on a one-and-a-half-year deal.

International career
Ricardo won his first and only cap for the Portugal under-21s on 16 July 2009, in a 7–1 rout of India for that year's Lusofonia Games.

References

External links

1989 births
Living people
Sportspeople from Braga
Portuguese footballers
Association football goalkeepers
Primeira Liga players
Liga Portugal 2 players
Segunda Divisão players
S.C. Braga players
S.C. Olhanense players
C.S. Marítimo players
Portimonense S.C. players
Slovak Super Liga players
FC DAC 1904 Dunajská Streda players
Portugal youth international footballers
Portugal under-21 international footballers
Portuguese expatriate footballers
Expatriate footballers in Slovakia
Portuguese expatriate sportspeople in Slovakia